The Tunisian General Labour Union (UGTT. ) is a national trade union center in Tunisia. It has a membership of more than one million and was founded January 20, 1946.

The UGTT is affiliated with the International Trade Union Confederation and the Arab Trade Union Confederation.

The UGTT worked together with the Tunisian Human Rights League, the Tunisian Confederation of Industry, Trade and Handicrafts and the Tunisian Order of Lawyers – collectively labelled the National Dialogue Quartet – to address the national discord following the Jasmine Revolution of 2011.  The National Dialogue Quartet was announced as the laureate of the 2015 Nobel Peace Prize "for its decisive contribution to the building of a pluralistic democracy in Tunisia".

Chairman (secretaries-general)

1946–1952: Farhat Hached
1952–1952: Mahmoud Messadi
1952–1954: Mohamed Kraïem
1954–1956: Ahmed Ben Salah
1956–1963: Ahmed Tlili
1963–1965: Habib Achour
1965–1970: Béchir Bellagha
1970–1978: Habib Achour
1978–1981: Tijani Abid
1981–1984: Taieb Baccouche
1984–1989: Habib Achour
1989–2000: Ismaïl Sahbani
2000–2011: Abdessalem Jerad
2011–2017: Houcine Abassi
2017–present: Noureddine Taboubi

References

External links

 
 Union to Union 

Trade unions in Tunisia
International Trade Union Confederation
1946 establishments in Tunisia
Trade unions established in 1946